Victor Manuel Rodriguez Rivera (born July 14, 1961) is an American professional baseball coach and former infielder. He played in Major League Baseball for the Baltimore Orioles in 1984 and the Minnesota Twins in 1989, appearing in 17 games. He is the assistant hitting coach of the Cleveland Guardians, appointed November 8, 2017, after holding the same post for the Boston Red Sox from 2013 to 2017.

Born in New York City, Rodriguez attended high school in Puerto Rico. He played 1,759 games in the minor leagues, batting .295 with 102 home runs. In 13 seasons at Triple-A, he batted .290.

Major leagues

Orioles
He played mostly as a second baseman as he moved his way slowly up through the Orioles organization, not reaching the Triple-A level for even a partial season until .

That was the season in which Rodriguez got his first chance at the majors. Called up in September when rosters expanded, Rodriguez appeared in 11 games for the Orioles, seven of them at second base, and went 7-for-17 for a batting average of .412. That would be the end of his career in the Orioles' organization, however, as he was traded to the San Diego Padres for fellow infielder Fritzie Connally.

Padres and Cardinals
He became a free agent after the season and signed with the St. Louis Cardinals, and spent the next two seasons with their top farm team, the Louisville Redbirds. By this time, Rodriguez had been shifted from second base to third base defensively.

Twins
After the  season, he again became a free agent, signing with the Minnesota Twins during the offseason. Called up in July to fill in for the injured Wally Backman, Rodriguez again posted impressive batting numbers, going 5-for-11 with 2 doubles for a .455 batting average and .636 slugging average. However, he was sent back to the minors in early August.

Minor leagues
That proved to be the end of Rodriguez's major league career. He remained in the Twins system for two more seasons, continuing to play for the Beavers. In , he moved on to the Philadelphia Phillies, playing two seasons for the Scranton/Wilkes-Barre Red Barons.

Major league coach
On November 30, 2012, the Red Sox appointed Rodriguez as their assistant to the hitting coach. Following manager John Farrell's dismissal on October 11, 2017, Farrell's coaches were told they were free to seek employment elsewhere.

Four weeks later, Rodriguez succeeded Matt Quatraro as the Indians' assistant hitting coach.

References

Further reading

External links
, or Retrosheet

1961 births
Living people
Alexandria Dukes players
American expatriate baseball players in Canada
American expatriate baseball players in Mexico
Baltimore Orioles players
Baseball coaches from New York (state)
Baseball players from New York (state)
Bluefield Orioles players
Boston Red Sox coaches
Charlotte O's players
Cleveland Indians coaches
Edmonton Trappers players
Las Vegas Stars (baseball) players
Louisville Redbirds players
Major League Baseball second basemen
Major League Baseball third basemen
Miami Orioles players
Minnesota Twins players
Olmecas de Tabasco players
Pawtucket Red Sox players
Portland Beavers players
Rochester Red Wings players
Scranton/Wilkes-Barre Red Barons players